The 2004 Grand Prix de Denain was the 46th edition of the Grand Prix de Denain cycle race and was held on 15 April 2004. The race was won by Thor Hushovd.

General classification

References

2004
2004 in road cycling
2004 in French sport
April 2004 sports events in France